The Social Security Appeal Tribunal was a tribunal in the United Kingdom which heard appeals from decisions made by the Department for Work and Pensions, HM Revenue and Customs and local authorities regarding entitlement to various forms of social security benefits.

History
In 1984, supplementary benefit appeal tribunals and National Insurance local tribunals were merged into Social Security Appeal Tribunal.

The Tribunal was abolished in November 2008 and its functions transferred to the First-tier Tribunal.

References

Former courts and tribunals in the United Kingdom
1984 establishments in the United Kingdom
2008 disestablishments in the United Kingdom
Courts and tribunals established in 1984
Courts and tribunals disestablished in 2008